is a Japanese professional golfer.

Tsukada plays on the Japan Golf Tour. He won his first title in 2016 at the Japan Golf Tour Championship.

Professional wins (1)

Japan Golf Tour wins (1)

Results in major championships

CUT = missed the halfway cut

Results in World Golf Championships

References

External links

Japanese male golfers
Japan Golf Tour golfers
Sportspeople from Nagano Prefecture
1985 births
Living people